Four ships of the Royal Navy have been named HMS Tourmaline:

, an  launched in 1875 she was converted to a coal hulk in 1899 and renamed C.115 in 1904. She was sold in 1920
, an  launched in 1919 and sold in 1931
, a  launched in 1942 as USS Usage she was transferred and renamed in 1943 on completion. Returned to the United States in 1947 she was subsequently transferred to Turkey as TCG Çardak 
, a  renamed Cassandra before being laid down

References

Royal Navy ship names